Gladiolus undulatus is a plant species in the family Iridaceae.

References

undulatus